Waldo Township is a township in Russell County, Kansas, United States. As of the 2010 United States Census, it had a population of 78. It includes the town of Waldo.

History
Waldo Township was organized from part of Fairview Township in 1904.

Geography
The center of Waldo Township is located at  (39.0500113, −98.7628561) at an elevation of 1,785 feet (544 m). The township lies in the Smoky Hills region of the Great Plains. The Saline River flows windingly east through the far southern part of the township. One of its tributaries, Paradise Creek, flows southeast through the southwestern part of the township to its confluence with the Saline. One of Paradise Creek's tributaries, Boswell Creek, runs east through the same area to its confluence with the creek. Another Saline tributary, Wolf Creek, flows southeast through the township's northeastern corner, met by its West Fork which runs generally east across the northern part of the township.

According to the United States Census Bureau, Waldo Township occupies an area of 72.04 square miles (186.6 km) of which 71.90 square miles (186.2 km) is land and 0.14 square miles (0.4 km) is water. Located in north-central Russell County, it includes the city of Waldo, which is located in the northwestern corner of the township, and it borders Osborne County's Valley and Jackson Townships to the north, Luray Township to the east, Center and Russell Townships to the south, and Paradise Township to the west.

Demographics

As of the 2010 census, there were 78 people, 36 households, and 21 families residing in the township. The population density was 1.1 people per square mile (0.4/km). There were 77 housing units at an average density of 1.1 per square mile (0.4/km). The racial makeup of the township was 98.7% White and 1.3% American Indian. Hispanic or Latino of any race were 0.0% of the population.

There were 36 households, out of which 22.2% had children under the age of 18 living with them, 52.8% were married couples living together, 2.8% had a male householder with no wife present, 2.8% had a female householder with no husband present, and 41.7% were non-families. 36.1% of all households were made up of individuals, and 27.8% had someone living alone who was 65 years of age or older. The average household size was 2.17, and the average family size was 2.86.

In the township, the population was spread out, with 23.1% under the age of 18, 2.5% from 18 to 24, 20.5% from 25 to 44, 29.5% from 45 to 64, and 24.4% who were 65 years of age or older. The median age was 47.5 years. For every 100 females, there were 116.7 males. For every 100 females age 18 and over, there were 106.9 males age 18 and over.

Education
The majority of the township is split between Unified School District (USD) 399, based in Natoma, Kansas, in the west and USD 299, based in Sylvan Grove, Kansas, in the east. Portions of southern Waldo Township lie in USD 407, based in Russell.

Transportation
U.S. Route 281 and Kansas Highway 18 (K-18) run concurrently east–west through the township's far northern portion, connecting to a network of mostly unpaved county roads laid out in a rough grid. A paved road, Bunker Hill-Luray Road, runs north–south through the southeastern part of the township, then turns east and exits 4 miles south of K-18.

References

Townships in Russell County, Kansas
Townships in Kansas